Charles M. Sommerfield was a theoretical physicist and professor emeritus at Yale University. He is the namesake of the Bogomol'nyi–Prasad–Sommerfield bound.

Biography 
Sommerfield studied for his bachelor's at Brooklyn College and earned his Ph.D. from Julian Schwinger at Harvard University in 1957. He worked at Berkeley and Harvard for two years each before becoming professor at Yale in 1961. He was a fellow of Trumbull College. Additionally, he has held visiting positions at the Institute for Advanced Study and the University of Florida.

He is notable for his work on high-energy physics. He is one of the namesakes of the Bogomol'nyi–Prasad–Sommerfield bound, along with his graduate student M.K. Prasad. Another notable graduate student he supervised was Howard Georgi.

Sommerfield was elected a fellow of the American Physical Society in 1968.

References 

Yale University faculty
20th-century American physicists
Particle physicists
Harvard University alumni
Brooklyn College alumni
Fellows of the American Physical Society